Armillaria viridiflava is a species of agaric fungus in the family Physalacriaceae. This species is found in South America.

See also 
 List of Armillaria species

References 

Fungal tree pathogens and diseases
viridiflava
Fungi described in 1989
Fungi of South America